Jayson Gaignard is a Canadian entrepreneur, networking specialist, and author who founded MastermindTalks, an invitation-only conference for entrepreneurs, in 2013.

Background

Gaignard dropped out of high school at the age of 17 and began working as an auto mechanic. In 2004, Gaignard founded VIP Services Inc., a Toronto-based full-service concierge company. The company evolved into an online ticket seller and changed its name to Tickets Canada, which generated $5 million in annual sales.

MastermindTalks

In 2012, Gaignard began curating dinners in Toronto, Canada with small groups of entrepreneurs that focused on relationship building. The invite-only dinners became MastermindTalks—larger conferences for entrepreneurs geared toward health, wealth, self-improvement, and networking. Past MastermindTalks speakers include Tim Ferriss, James Altucher, A. J. Jacobs, Esther Perel, Dave Asprey, Guy Kawasaki, and Marc Ecko. Forbes described Gaignard as one of the top networkers to watch in 2015.

References

External links
Jayson Gaignard on Twitter
MastermindTalks
MastermindTalks Podcast

Living people
Canadian company founders
Year of birth missing (living people)
Place of birth missing (living people)